Alaylı can refer to:

 Alaylı, Antalya
 Alaylı, Yenişehir